There are at least 50 small mammal species known to occur in Yellowstone National Park.

Species are listed by common name, scientific name, typical habitat and relative abundance.

Raccoons
Order: Carnivora
Family: Procyonidae

Raccoon, Procyon lotor, rivers, cottonwoods, rare

Badgers and weasels

Order: Carnivora
Family: Mustelidae

Wolverine, Gulo gulo, alpine, coniferous forests, rare
North American river otter, Lontra canadensis, rivers, lakes, ponds, common
Pacific marten, Martes caurina, coniferous forests, common
American ermine, Mustela richardsonii, willows to spruce/fir forests, common
Long-tailed weasel, Neogale frenata, willows to spruce/fir forests, common
American mink, Neogale vison, riparian forests, occasional
Fisher, Pekania pennanti, forests, rare
American badger, Taxidea taxus, sagebrush, common

Skunks
Order: Carnivora
Family: Mephitidae

Striped skunk, Mephitis mephitis, riparian to forest, rare

Hares and rabbits

Order: Lagomorpha
Family: Leporidae

Snowshoe hare, Lepus americanus, forests, willows, common
White-tailed jackrabbit, Lepus townsendii, sagebrush, grasslands, common
Desert cottontail, Sylvilagus audubonii, shrub lands, common
Mountain cottontail, Sylvilagus nuttallii, shrub lands, common

Pikas
Order: Lagomorpha
Family: Ochotonidae

American pika, Ochotona princeps, rocky slopes, common

Shrews

Order: Soricomorpha
Family: Soricidae
Dusky shrew, Sorex monticolus, moist meadows, forests, common
Masked shrew, Sorex cinereus, moist meadows, forests, common
American water shrew, Sorex palustris, moist meadows, forests, common
Preble's shrew, Sorex preblei, moist meadows, forests, rare, if present
Dwarf shrew, Sorex nanus, moist meadows, forests, rare

Beaver
Order: Rodentia
Family: Castoridae

 Beaver, Castor canadensis, ponds, streams, approximately 500

Squirrels

Order: Rodentia
Family: Sciuridae
 Least chipmunk, Tamias minimus, forests, common
 Uinta chipmunk, Tamias umbrinus, forests, common
 Yellow-pine chipmunk, Tamias amoenus, forests, common
 Yellow-bellied marmot, Marmota flaviventris, rocky slopes, common
 Golden-mantled ground squirrel, Callospermophilus lateralis, forests, rocky slopes, common
 Northern flying squirrel, Glaucomys sabrinus, forests, occasional
 American red squirrel, Tamiasciurus hudsonicus, forests, common
 Uinta ground squirrel, Urocitellus armatus, sagebrush, meadows, common

Pocket gophers
Order:  Rodentia
Family: Geomyidae

 Northern pocket gopher, Thomomys talpoides, sagebrush, meadows, forests, common

Mice

Order: Rodentia
Family: Cricetidae

 Deer mouse, Peromyscus maniculatus, grasslands, common

Jumping mice
Order: Rodentia
Family: Dipodidae

 Western jumping mouse, Zapus princeps, riparian, occasional

Muskrats, voles and woodrats

Order: Rodentia
Family: Cricetidae

 Muskrat, Ondatra zibethicus, streams, lakes, ponds, common
 Western heather vole, Phenacomys intermedius, sagebrush to forests, occasional
 Long-tailed vole, Microtus longicaudus, moist meadows, common
 Meadow vole, Microtus pennsylvanicus, moist meadows, common
 Montane vole, Microtus montanus, moist meadows, common
 Southern red-backed vole, Myodes gapperi, dense forests, common
 Water vole, Microtus richardsoni, riparian, occasional
 Bushy-tailed woodrat, Neotoma cinerea, rocky slopes, common

Porcupines
Order: Rodentia
Family: Erethizontidae

 North American porcupine, Erethizon dorsatum, forests, sagebrush, willows, common

Bats

Order: Chiroptera
Family: Vespertilionidae

 Big brown bat, Eptesicus fuscus, roost in sheltered areas, common
 Fringe-tailed bat, Myotis thysanodes, roost in cliffs, large snags, uncommon
 Hoary bat, Lasiurus cinereus, roost in trees. uncommon
 Little brown bat, Myotis lucifugus, roost in caves, buildings, trees, common
 Long-eared bat, Myotis evotis, roost in cliffs, buildings, uncommon
 Long-legged bat, Myotis volans, roost in tree cavities, cliffs, buildings, common
 Silver-haired bat, Lasionycteris noctivagans, roost in trees, including snags, common
 Western small-footed bat, Myotis ciliolabrum, roost in rocky areas, caves, rare, if present
 Townsend's big-eared bat, Corynorhinus townsendii, roost in caves, uncommon
 Yuma bat, Myotis yumanensis, roost in caves, buildings, trees. rare, if present

See also
 Animals of Yellowstone
 Mammals of Yellowstone National Park

Further reading

Notes

mammals
Mammals
mammals
Yellowstone